Thenmazhai is a 1966 Indian Tamil-language romantic comedy film, directed by Muktha Srinivasan and produced by V. Ramasamy. The film stars Gemini Ganesan and K. R. Vijaya, with Major Sundarrajan, Nagesh, Cho, Sachu and Manorama in supporting roles. It was released on 23 September 1966.

Plot 
Basker is a sleepwalker. Nagalingam accuses Basker of killing Chithambaram while in sleep and uses it to blackmail him into performing various acts. Nirmala is in love with Basker and married him in secrecy. Finally, Nagalingam wants Basker to marry a rich girl, Girija, and give all the dowry money to him in return for destroying the evidence Nagalingam allegedly has of Basker's guilt. Nirmala's brother, Venu and Chithambaram's son, Vasu, combine their resources to expose Nagalingam as the killer of Chithambaram.

Indra acts as the romantic angle between Vasu and Venu as they vie for her attention with the former acting as a doctor to get her respect and the latter acting as an paralytic patient to get her sympathy in an attempt to impress her providing the comedic angle as well as prove their mettle and ingenuity which comes in handy to handle the cunning Nagalingam.

Cast 
 Gemini Ganesan as Baskar
 K. R. Vijaya as Nirmala
 Major Sundarrajan as Nagalingam
 Nagesh as Venu
 Cho as Chithambaram/Vasu
 Manorama as Indra
 Sachu as Girija
 T. P. Muthulakshmi as Appadurai's wife
 Vennira Aadai Moorthy as Muthu
 S. Rama Rao as Appadurai

Production 
The film features animated introductory credits.

Soundtrack 
Music was by T. K. Ramamoorthy Lyrics by Vaali.

Reception 
Kalki gave a mixed review, praising the performances of some of the actors, but criticising the music, and concluded that the film was overall unsatisfactory.

References

External links 
 

1960s Tamil-language films
1966 films
1966 romantic comedy films
Films directed by Muktha Srinivasan
Films set in Chennai
Indian black-and-white films
Indian romantic comedy films